The NEC C&C Prize is an award given by the NEC Corporation "in recognition of outstanding contributions to research and development and/or pioneering work in the fields of semiconductors, computers, telecommunications and their integrated technologies." Established in 1985, through the NEC's nonprofit C&C Foundation, C&C Prizes are awarded to two groups or individuals annually. There is no restriction on nationality of nominees. Winners will receive a prize which includes a cash award of 10,000,000 yen and a certificate. The award ceremony is held annually in Tokyo, Japan.

Recipients
Medal recipients include Nobel Prize winners and scientists, from the father of optics to the pioneer of Internet.

Years (2018-present)

Years (2007-2017)

Years (1996-2006)

Years (1985-1995)

References

External links
財団法人 NEC C&C財団(Japanese)
NEC C&C Foundation

Awards established in 1985
Japanese science and technology awards
NEC Corporation
1985 establishments in Japan